The Pink Line is a new subway line proposal for the Montreal Metro in Quebec. First proposed by municipal councillor Sylvain Ouellet in September 2011, the Pink Line in its current form was a "central campaign promise" of the mayoral campaign of Valérie Plante, leader of the political party Projet Montréal and now mayor of Montreal. The project was proposed to be finished by 2025, at a cost of an estimated C$5.9 billion.

The project has since been added to Quebec's 10-year infrastructure plan, and feasibility studies for the line's western section began in June 2021.

The proposed route of the line would traverse many Montreal neighbourhoods. It would start in Montreal North, and travel southwest through the city, with connections to the blue line extension, Mont-Royal metro station, and Place-des-Arts station. Given this routing, the section from Montreal North to Pie-IX is generally seen as the successor to the cancelled White Line originally proposed in the 1980s. A second phase of the project would travel southwest from Downtown Montreal, through Westmount, the Notre-Dame-de-Grâce neighbourhood, Montreal West, and end at Lachine. This would be the first Montreal Metro line with above-ground stations.

List of stations 

The pink line is proposed to have 29 stations, listed in the table below.

References
 

Montreal Metro
Proposed railway lines in Canada